The 2016 NASCAR Pinty's Series was the tenth season of the NASCAR Pinty's Series. Beginning on May 22 at Canadian Tire Motorsport Park, the season consisted of twelve races at eleven different venues in Canada. The season ended at Kawartha Speedway on September 18. Scott Steckly was the defending Drivers' Champion. Cayden Lapcevich won the 2016 championship when the Green Flag dropped at the last race, as there were not enough entries for Lapcevich to lose that many points that Andrew Ranger could have taken the championship. Lapcevich won the championship by a 54-point margin over Ranger.

The season was the first since naming rights of the series were transferred from Canadian Tire to frozen chicken supplier Pinty's.

Drivers

Schedule
The 2016 Pinty's Series schedule was released on December 16, 2015 and featured twelve events, one more than the 2015 season. The additional race was held on July 16 at Exhibition Place in Toronto, which returned to the schedule after a five-year absence.

Notes

Results and standings

Races

Drivers' championship

(key) Bold – Pole position awarded by time. Italics – Pole position set by final practice results or Owner's points. * – Most laps led.

See also
2016 NASCAR Sprint Cup Series
2016 NASCAR Xfinity Series
2016 NASCAR Camping World Truck Series
2016 NASCAR K&N Pro Series East
2016 NASCAR K&N Pro Series West
2016 NASCAR Whelen Modified Tour
2016 NASCAR Whelen Southern Modified Tour
2016 NASCAR Whelen Euro Series

References

External links

Pinty's Series Standings and Statistics for 2016

NASCAR Pinty's Series

NASCAR Pinty's Series